Sergeant Mike is a 1944 American drama film directed by Henry Levin, which stars Larry Parks, Jeanne Bates, and Loren Tindall.

Cast list
 Larry Parks as Pvt. Tom Allen
 Jeanne Bates as Terry Arno
 Loren Tindall as Simms
 Jim Bannon as Patrick Henry
 Robert Williams as Sgt. Rankin
 Richard Powers as Reed
 Larry Joe Olsen as S. K. Arno
 Eddie Acuff as Monnohan
 John Tyrrell as Pvt. Rogers
 Charles Wagenheim as Hall

References

External links
 
 
 

Columbia Pictures films
Films directed by Henry Levin
1949 drama films
1949 films
American drama films
Pacific War films
World War II films made in wartime
Films about dogs
American black-and-white films
1944 drama films
1944 films